Ajit Manohar Pai (born 28 April 1945) is a former Indian cricketer who played in one Test in 1969.

Cricket career
A tall opening bowler and useful lower-order batsman, Pai made his debut for Bombay in the Ranji Trophy in the 1968-69 season. After taking 11 wickets in his first three first-class matches he was selected to represent West Zone in the Duleep Trophy. He helped each team to the championship and finished the season with 129 runs at an average of 25.80 and 23 wickets at 23.21.

In September 1969 he took 7 for 42 for West Zone against Central Zone in the Duleep Trophy and was selected to open the bowling for India in the First Test against New Zealand later that month. He took two wickets and India won, but for the Second Test the selectors decided to use the all-rounders Rusi Surti and Syed Abid Ali to open the bowling and strengthened the spin attack with Srinivasaraghavan Venkataraghavan. Again he helped West Zone and Bombay win their respective championships in 1969-70.

He did not play any further matches in the Duleep Trophy, but in 1970-71 he had an outstanding match for Bombay against Saurashtra in the Ranji Trophy. Batting at number seven, he made 91 out of a Bombay total of 265, then took 5 for 22 and 6 for 30 to take Bombay to victory by an innings and 82 runs. Once again he played in the Bombay side that won the Ranji Trophy.

His bowling form fell away after 1970-71, but he played in two more Ranji Trophy-winning Bombay sides, in 1974-75 and 1975–76, seasons in which his batting (310 runs at 28.11) and catching (18 catches in 10 matches) were more prominent. The 1975-76 victory in the final over Bihar was his last first-class match.

Later life
Pai worked as an architect for the Bank of Baroda.

References

External links
 Ajit Pai at Cricket Archive
 Ajit Pai at Cricinfo

1945 births
Living people
India Test cricketers
Indian cricketers
Mumbai cricketers
West Zone cricketers
Cricketers from Mumbai